Haspra may refer to:

People 
 Josef Haszpra, Czechoslovakian caster and founder

Place names 
 Haspra, a town in Crimea